The Hakkari Expedition of 1916 (21 May–29 June 1916) was a number of raids conducted by the Assyrian volunteers against local Hakkari Kurdish tribesmen who the year prior, with the help of the Ottomans expelled the Assyrians from Hakkari and resulted in them settling in Russian controlled Urmia and its surroundings.

Preparations for Expedition 
On May 21, Malik Ismail II and Malik Khoshaba with their fighters left Urmia and the surrounding settlements to Salmas, they arrived the next day and met Dawid Mar Shimun and Malik Shamizdin among other tribal chiefs and their fighters whom had been waiting for the arrival of Ismail and Khoshaba. On May 23, they left to Bashqalan and reached Qudchanis on May 27 and found only a thousand cossacks guarding it.

Battles in the mountains of Hakkari 
From Qudchanis the Assyrians split into two branches the first under the leadership of Malik Ismail went to darawa where he met Tyaraye who had re-established themselves in their former villages and the second under Dawid Mar Shimun went on the road to Jurlamerk, they reached Tkhuma and found it in ruins and empty. In Tkhuma both forces met and, after several fierce battles, many inaccessible Kurdish castles and fortresses were destroyed.

Soon after the army returned for Chal, whose fortress was in very mountainous terrain, but after the Assyrians divided themselves in three groups (the first led by Malik Ismail, the second led by Malik Khammo of the Baz tribe and the third led by Malik Shamizdin), the Assyrians attacked all the villages around and looted many sheep and cattle. Dawid Mar Shimun waited until the whole Assyrian force pulled out and the booty from the looting was divided.

Assyrian retreat into Urmia 
Before leaving Malik Ismail told the Tyaraye who had reestablished themselves in their homes that the Russian Army had returned from Qudchanis to Bashqalan and that the assyrians that returned to Hakkari wouldn't withstand the Ottomans and Kurds on their own and that it would be best for them to join the Assyrians in Urmia and Salmas. On June 29, all the Assyrian fighters who partook in the expedition returned to Russian occupied Iran.

See also 

 1917 Hakkari Expedition
 Battle of Mount Seray
 Urmia Clashes
 Battle Charah
 Battle of Suldouze
 Persian Campaign
 Sayfo
 Assyrian Rebellion
 Assyrian Volunteers
 Assyrian Levies
 Mar Benyamin Shimun
 Mar Paulos Shimun
 Agha Petros
 Malik Khoshaba
 Surma Mar Shimun
 Simko Shikak Revolt (1918-1922)
 Simko Shikak Revolt (1926)

References 

History of the Assyrians
History of Hakkâri Province
Ottoman Empire
Kurdish tribes